Warren Landing may refer to:

 Warren Landing, Manitoba, a village in Canada
 Warren Landing Lower Range Lights, a navigational aid
 Warren Landing Upper Range Lights, a navigational aid